The Phoenix Award annually recognizes one English-language children's book published twenty years earlier that did not then win a major literary award. It is named for the mythical bird phoenix that is reborn from its own ashes, signifying the book's rise from relative obscurity.

The award was established and is conferred by the Children's Literature Association (ChLA), a nonprofit organization based in the United States whose mission is to advance "the serious study of children's literature". The winner is selected by an elected committee of five ChLA members, from nominations by members and outsiders. The token is a brass statue.

The inaugural, 1985 Phoenix Award recognized The Mark of the Horse Lord by Rosemary Sutcliff (Oxford, 1965). Beginning 1989, as many as two runners-up have been designated "Honor Books", with 34 named for the 29 years to 2017.

A parallel award for children's picture books, the Phoenix Picture Book Award was approved in 2010 and inaugurated in 2013. There are two awards if the writer and illustrator are different people. "Books are considered not only for the quality of their illustrations, but for the way pictures and text work together to tell a story (whether fact or fiction).  Wordless books are judged on the ability of the pictures alone to convey a story."

Phoenix Award winners

There have been 35 Award winners and 35 Honor Books announced since 1985 (1965 to 1998 publications).

 ‡ Seven acceptance speeches have been published online in one of two locations: Monica Hughes, 2000; Peter Dickinson, 2001; Zibby Oneal, 2002; Berlie Doherty, 2004; Peter Dickinson, 2008; Virginia Euwer Wolff, 2011; Karen Hesse, 2012.

Multiple awards

As of 2021, there have been three two-time winners of the Phoenix Award:
 Rosemary Sutcliff, 1985, 2010
 Peter Dickinson, 2001, 2008
 Margaret Mahy, 2005, 2007

Mahy of New Zealand was also a runner up in 2006.

Several of the winners have also received the British Carnegie Medal for other books: Sutcliff (1959); Garner (1967); Garfield (1970); Southall (1971); Hunter (1974); Dickinson (1979, 1980); Mahy (1982, 1984); Doherty (1986, 1991).

Three of the winners have also won the American Newbery Medal for other books: Konigsburg (1968 and 1997); Paterson (1978, 1981); Hesse (1998).

Picture Book Award winners

The Phoenix Picture Book Award was first given in 2013, for books originally published in 1993. 

The writer is listed first, the illustrator second if distinct.

  When the Wind Stops, written by Zolotow and illustrated by Vitale  (HarperCollins, 1995), "revised and newly illustrated" . When the Wind Stops, written by Zolotow and edited by Ursula Nordstrom, was published in 1962 with illustrations by Howard Knotts (New York: Harper & Row) and by Joe Lasker (London: Abelard-Schuman).

See also

Notes

References

External links
 Children's Literature Association (ChLA)
 Awards from previous years (1985–2007) at chla.wikispaces.com, predecessor to the ChLA website – identifies some publishers of later editions; provides award citations of 2005 to 2007 winners
 Children's Literature Association Quarterly at Project MUSE (jhu.edu/journals), Volume 1 (1976) to present; annual conference Proceedings, 1978 to 1991 only  – open-access lists of contents include full bibliographic citations for articles and publications searches for authors 

American children's literary awards
Awards established in 1985
1985 establishments in the United States